Neiron Ball (August 20, 1992 – September 9, 2019) was an American football linebacker for the Oakland Raiders of the National Football League (NFL). He played college football for the University of Florida and was drafted by the Raiders in the fifth round of the 2015 NFL Draft.

Early years
Ball attended Jackson High School in Jackson, Georgia, where he played football for coach Mike Parris. As a junior, he recorded 104 tackles (35 for loss), 19 sacks and forced seven fumbles. Ball also starred in track & field at Jackson, where he competed as a sprinter (best of 11.19 seconds in the 100-meter dash) and high jumper (PR of 1.73m or 5'8").

Ball was rated a four-star prospect by both Scout.com and Rivals.com. He was viewed as the No. 16 outside linebacker in the country by Scout.com and the No. 19 weak side defensive end by Rivals.com. Ball chose Florida over Alabama, Clemson, Georgia, LSU and South Carolina.

College career
Ball played at Florida from 2011 to 2014.

Professional career

Ball was drafted by the Oakland Raiders in the fifth round of the 2015 NFL Draft. On September 27, 2015, Ball got his first career sack against Josh McCown in a 27-20 win against the Cleveland Browns. On December 12, 2015, Ball was placed on injured reserve. On September 3, 2016, Ball was again waived by the Raiders and was placed on injured reserve.

Death
Ball was first diagnosed with arteriovenous malformation in 2011 while playing for Florida, but recovered and was able to play football. In December 2018, he suffered an aneurysm and was placed into a medically-induced coma. Ball died from the condition in Jackson, Georgia on September 9, 2019.

References

External links
 
 Florida Gators bio 
 Oakland Raiders bio

1992 births
2019 deaths
People from Jackson, Georgia
Sportspeople from the Atlanta metropolitan area
Players of American football from Georgia (U.S. state)
American football linebackers
Florida Gators football players
Oakland Raiders players
Deaths from aneurysm